Together We're Stranger is No-Man's fifth studio album released by the Snapper Music label in 2003.

The first four songs are linked to form a 28-minute suite of continuous music with recurring lyrical and musical themes. The remaining three songs feature acoustic guitar and clarinet-dominated arrangements and are amongst the band's most stripped-down and intimate recordings. In keeping with other No-Man releases, the title track reuses the musical basis of a previous Steven Wilson work: that of "Drugged" from his first Bass Communion album. The chord progression in "The Break-Up For Real" would later be reused by Wilson for songs on Porcupine Tree's 2009 album, The Incident.

The album was released in a limited edition white vinyl format on the Dutch label Tonefloat in November 2005 and in February 2007 on Snapper Music as a two disc CD/DVD edition comprising a remastered 5.1 DVD-A surround sound mix, high resolution 24 bit stereo of the album and additional bonus material. In 2014 was released a remaster (by Steven Wilson) single-disc edition on the Kscope label, includes 2 bonus tracks "Bluecoda" and "The Break-up for Real – drum mix".

Track listing

Two disc Snapper edition 
The two disc edition (on Snapper Music) comes with the original stereo mix on CD and a DVD featuring the album in 5.1 DVD-A surround sound and in high resolution 24 bit stereo, with bonus tracks "Bluecoda" and "The Break-up for Real – drum mix" as well as the video for "Things I Want to Tell You" and a photo gallery. Both "Bluecoda" and "The Break-up for Real – drum mix" later appeared on the compilation album All the Blue Changes – An Anthology 1988–2003 and on the 2014 Remaster version of the album, released by Kscope label.

Personnel 

Tim Bowness – vocals, words
Steven Wilson – instruments, harmony vocals

with:

Michael Bearpark – guitar solo (1)
Stephen Bennett – noise (1), organ and cymbal (6)
Ben Castle – clarinet, bass clarinet, flute
Peter Chilvers – space-bass (1,2), bass (6)
Roger Eno – harmonium (5,8)
David Picking – trumpet (1,2), electronics (1,2,3,4), percussion (2,5,9)

External links
No-Man's Official Website
No-Man's Fan Site

References

2003 albums
No-Man albums
Snapper Music albums